Marc Vincent Sappington (born February 9, 1978) is an American spree killer and cannibal convicted of murdering four acquaintances in March and April 2001 in Kansas City, Kansas. He gained notoriety for eating part of the leg of one of his victims, Alton "Fred" Brown.

Lawyers for Sappington blamed the four-day killing spree on a history of schizophrenia and daily use of the hallucinogenic drug PCP. Sappington himself claimed that voices in his head told him to eat flesh and blood or he would die.

Sappington was convicted on June 23, 2004, of murdering Terry T. Green, 25, Michael Weaver Jr., 22, and Alton "Fred" Brown Jr., 16 in April 2001.
Sappington was convicted on December 10, 2004, of an attempted aggravated robbery and murder of David Mashak at his auto dealership in March 2001. Sappington's conviction was affirmed by the Kansas Supreme Court on November 2, 2007.

In an April 2001 videotape, Sappington had confessed to stabbing Weaver to death, leaving Green's body in a car, and shooting Brown before dismembering his body and eating a small piece of his leg.

References

External links
All about Marc Sappington, The Kansas City Vampire, by Seamus McGraw
State v. Sappington
State v. Sappington

1978 births
People with schizophrenia
American prisoners sentenced to life imprisonment
Prisoners sentenced to life imprisonment by Kansas
American spree killers
Living people
American cannibals
American people convicted of murder
People convicted of murder by Kansas
African-American people